The White Potato Lake Garden Beds Site, a Native American archaeological site, is located in Brazeau, northeastern Wisconsin. The location was added to the National Register of Historic Places in Wisconsin in 2005. The site lies near White Potato Lake.

History
The site is believed to have been used by Native Americans for farming from around 1000 to 1650 CE. It is visited by archaeologists to study indigenous horticultural and agricultural practices.

See also
Old Copper Complex
National Register of Historic Places listings in Oconto County, Wisconsin

References

Great Lakes tribal culture
Native American history of Wisconsin
Archaeological sites on the National Register of Historic Places in Wisconsin
Geography of Oconto County, Wisconsin
National Register of Historic Places in Oconto County, Wisconsin